Stephen Jordan (born August 27, 1966) is a former award-winning Canadian Football League defensive back.

Jordan played his college football at the University of Illinois. His professional career began with the Hamilton Tiger-Cats in 1989, the year he won the CFL's Most Outstanding Rookie Award. After another year in Hamilton, he finished his career after two seasons with the Edmonton Eskimos.

References

1966 births
Living people
African-American players of Canadian football
Canadian Football League Rookie of the Year Award winners
Edmonton Elks players
Hamilton Tiger-Cats players
Players of American football from Sacramento, California
Players of Canadian football from Sacramento, California
Sacramento City Panthers football players
21st-century African-American people
20th-century African-American sportspeople